Negrine District is a district of Tébessa Province, Algeria. 
The district population in 1998 was 14815 inhabitants and has an elevation of 321m above sea level and is located  near the Chott el Ghasa.

References

Districts of Tébessa Province